

Olary is a town and locality on the Barrier Highway in South Australia. It is situated near Olary Creek and is one of the easternmost settlements in South Australia. The name "Olary" was first given to a nearby well or waterhole by pastoralists Duffield, Harrold and Hurd.

Description and history

This small settlement was established in the late 1880s to service the highway and the railway which pass through here. O'Lary Post Office opened on 12 October 1886, was renamed Oolarie around 1888 and Olary around 1896. After the modernisation of transport which travelled between Adelaide and Broken Hill the village population declined. However it still has a hotel and general store to cater for the transient road and railway workers and travellers.

The Flinders-Olary NatureLink includes the mountainous Flinders and Olary Ranges together with the connecting plains country to cover 6% of the South Australian state.

In 2010 the historic Bimbowrie Cobb and Co coach house near Olary became the scene of a traditional restoration operation with almost 20 tradespeople attending a five-day training course in stonemasonry restoration techniques. Low-security prisoners from the Port Augusta Prison were among those who assisted with the project.

The nearby Mount Victoria Well & Whim Historic Site is listed on the South Australian Heritage Register.

Governance
Olary is located within the federal division of Grey, the state electoral district of Stuart and the Pastoral Unincorporated Area of South Australia. As of 2019, the community within Olary received municipal services from a South Australian government agency, the Outback Communities Authority.

See also
List of cities and towns in South Australia

References

External links

Towns in South Australia
Far North (South Australia)
Places in the unincorporated areas of South Australia